Atractus gigas, the giant ground snake, is a species of snake in the family Colubridae. The species can be found in Ecuador and Peru.

References 

Atractus
Reptiles of Ecuador
Reptiles of Peru
Reptiles described in 2006